Hugh Thomson  is a British travel writer, film maker and explorer.  His The Green Road Into Trees: A Walk Through England won the 2014 Wainwright Prize for nature and travel writing.

He was appointed as a Royal Literary Fund fellow at Oxford Brookes University in 2012–2014.

He has led research expeditions in Peru exploring Inca settlements, including the discovery of Cota Coca in 2002 and a 2003 study of Llaqtapata. He has also led filming expeditions to Mount Kilimanjaro, Bhutan, Afghanistan and Mexico.

Thomson is also an award-winning film maker: his Dancing in the Street: A Rock and Roll History television documentary series was nominated for the  Huw Wheldon Award For The Best Arts Programme or Series in the 1997 BAFTA awards and the three-part Indian Journeys he created with William Dalrymple won the 2001 Grierson Award for Best Documentary Series.

He has an MA from the University of Cambridge and is a Fellow of the Royal Geographical Society. His grandfathers were G. P. Thomson and W. L. Bragg, both of whom, and both their fathers J. J. Thomson and W. H. Bragg, won the Nobel prize in physics.

Publications
The White Rock: an exploration of the Inca heartland (2001, Weidenfeld & Nicolson)
Nanda Devi: a journey to the last sanctuary (2004, Weidenfeld & Nicolson)
Cochineal Red: travels through ancient Peru (2006, Weidenfeld & Nicolson)
Tequila Oil: getting lost in Mexico (2009, Weidenfeld & Nicolson)
50 Wonders of the World (2009, Quercus)
 The Green Road Into The Trees: a walk through England (2014, Preface Publishing (Random House))
 One Man and a Mule:  Across England with a Pack Mule (2017, Preface Publishing (Random House))

References

External links

Royal Literary Fund "Writers Aloud" interviews with Hugh Thomson, 2016: part 1 and part 2

1960 births
Living people
British travel writers
Alumni of the University of Cambridge
Fellows of the Royal Geographical Society